Gerald McBoing-Boing is an animated short film about a little boy who speaks through sound effects instead of spoken words. It was produced by United Productions of America (UPA) and given wide release by Columbia Pictures on November 2, 1950. It was adapted by Phil Eastman and Bill Scott from a story by Dr. Seuss, directed by Robert Cannon, and produced by John Hubley.

Gerald McBoing-Boing won the 1950 Oscar for Best Animated Short. In 1994, it was voted #9 of The 50 Greatest Cartoons of all time by members of the animation field, making it the highest ranked UPA cartoon on the list. In 1995, it was selected for preservation in the United States National Film Registry by the Library of Congress as being "culturally, historically, or aesthetically significant".

Original recording, UPA film and sequels
Dr. Seuss's story had originally appeared on a children's record, scored by Billy May, issued by Capitol Records, and read by radio veteran Harold Peary as "The Great Gildersleeve".

This film was the first successful theatrical cartoon produced by UPA after their initial experiments with a short series of cartoons featuring Columbia Pictures stalwarts The Fox and the Crow. It was an artistic attempt to break away from the strict realism in animation that had been developed and perfected by Walt Disney. Cartoons did not have to obey the rules of the real world (as the short films of Tex Avery and their cartoon physics proved), and so UPA experimented with a non-realistic style that depicted caricatures rather than lifelike representations.

This was a major step in the development of limited animation, which had the added advantage of being much less expensive to produce.

The story describes Gerald McCloy, a two-year-old boy who begins "talking" in the form of sound effects, his first word being the titular "boing boing". Panicked, his father calls the doctor, who informs him that there is nothing he can do about it. As the boy grows up, he picks up more sounds and is able to make communicative gestures, but is still unable to utter a single word of the English language. In spite of this, he is admitted to a general public school, but more problems arise when he is chided by his peers and given the derogatory name "Gerald McBoing-Boing". After startling (and enraging) his father, he has no choice but to run away and hop a train to an unknown location. Just before he catches the train, however, a talent scout from the NBC Radio Network (as identified by the NBC chimes) discovers Gerald and hires him as NBC's foley artist, performing shows for a division of the company labeled "XYZ" on the microphones, and Gerald becomes very famous.

UPA produced three follow-up shorts: Gerald McBoing Boing's Symphony (1953), How Now Boing Boing (1954), and Gerald McBoing! Boing! on Planet Moo (1956), an Academy Award nominee. The second and third films maintained the Dr. Seuss-style rhyming narration, but were not based on his work. The final film abandoned this approach.

All four Gerald McBoing Boing shorts were released in 1980 on home video under the title Columbia Pictures Presents Cartoon Adventures Starring Gerald McBoing Boing. The shorts were presented in sub-par quality, especially Planet Moo, which was squeezed to fit the CinemaScope frame to standard TV screen size. It was reissued in 1985 as part of RCA/Columbia Pictures Home Video's "Magic Window" series of children's videotapes and went out of print in 1995.

The first short was included as a special feature on Sony's 2001 DVD release of The 5,000 Fingers of Dr. T. All but the second were included in the special features of the two-disc special edition of the DVD Hellboy (released on July 27, 2004), as the cartoon can be seen playing on TV monitors in the background in several scenes. In January 2006, Sony re-issued the four shorts on DVD, featuring cleaned-up prints and all presented in their original aspect ratio.

A character rather similar to Gerald McBoing Boing appears as Tiny Tim in the 1962 NBC television special Mister Magoo's Christmas Carol, now as a speaking character. On the 2001 DVD release, an animated short was included that features Mr. Magoo, also a UPA character, babysitting McBoing Boing.

Television

UPA
The Gerald McBoing-Boing Show (1956–57)
 
In 1956, CBS created a half-hour Gerald McBoing-Boing Show, with well-known radio announcer Bill Goodwin narrating. Broadcast at 5:30 p.m. on Sunday evenings, it was a showcase for UPA's cartoons, including Dusty of the Circus, The Twirlinger Twins, and Punch and Judy. The program proved too expensive to continue and lasted only three months.

The episodes were repeated on Friday nights in the summer of 1957. Thus, The Gerald McBoing-Boing Show apparently became the first cartoon series broadcast regularly during prime time, preceding The Flintstones by two seasons.

TV specials

A character similar to Gerald McBoing-Boing appeared as Tiny Tim in the 1962 TV special Mr. Magoo's Christmas Carol, and a bonus feature of the Mr. Magoo's Christmas Carol DVD features Gerald McBoing-Boing being babysat by the nearsighted Magoo. The short is titled "Magoo Meets McBoing-Boing".

Gerald McBoing-Boing (2005–2007)

A series based on the original cartoon started airing on Cartoon Network (United States) on August 22, 2005, as part of their short-lived Tickle-U programming block, and aired on Teletoon/Télétoon (Canada) on August 29 the same year. Each 11-minute episode features a series of vignettes with Gerald, of which the "fantasy tales" are done in Seussian rhyme. There are also sound checks, gags, and "real-life" portions of the show. It was broadcast also ABC in Australia.

Gerald still only makes sounds (but is praised for it instead), but now has two speaking friends, Janine and Jacob, as well as a dog named Burp, who only burps. Gerald's parents (names unknown) complete the regular cast, although his mother has black hair in this series instead of blonde. The series was produced in Canada by Cookie Jar Entertainment, and directed by Robin Budd and story edited/written by John Derevlany. The animation was done by Mercury Filmworks in Ottawa.

References

Further reading

External links

 
 Gerald McBoing-Boing at Don Markstein's Toonopedia. Archived from the original on August 24, 2016.
 The Big Cartoon DataBase
 Gerald McBoing-Boing essay by Daniel Eagan in America's Film Legacy: The Authoritative Guide to the Landmark Movies in the National Film Registry, A&C Black, 2010 , pages 442-443 

1950 animated films
1950 films
1950s American animated films
1950s animated short films
Best Animated Short Academy Award winners
Child characters in animated films
Columbia Pictures animated short films
McBoing-Boing, Gerald
Film characters introduced in 1950
Films scored by Gail Kubik
Films based on works by Dr. Seuss
Surreal comedy films
United States National Film Registry films
UPA films
DreamWorks Classics franchises
UPA series and characters
Columbia Pictures short films
Films about disability
1950s English-language films